HTC Exodus 1 is an entry level 2019 HTC U series engineering based android OS powered blockchain-secured "hardware cryptocurrency wallet" mobile phone developed by HTC Corporation.
Its default web browser application is Brave and it runs DApps through a partnership with Opera.

Data such as keys to cryptocurrencies can be recovered via a social key recovery mechanism. To do this, the user names a few trustworthy people in advance, each of whom must download an app. The information is then pieced together using a secret release process and distributed to these contacts. If necessary, the user only has to query and compile the partial information in order to regain access to his deposits.

Sources

Blockchains